In astronomy, the initial mass function (IMF) is an empirical function that describes the initial distribution of masses for a population of stars during star formation. IMF not only describes the formation and evolution of individual stars, it also serves as an important link that describes the formation and evolution of galaxies. The IMF is often given as a probability density function (PDF) that describes the probability of a star that has a certain mass. It differs from the present-day mass function (PDMF), which describes the current distribution of masses of stars, such as red giants, white dwarfs, neutron stars, and black holes, after a period of time of evolution away from the main sequence stars. IMF is derived from the luminosity function while PDMF is derived from the present-day luminosity function. IMF and PDMF can be linked through the "stellar creation function". Stellar creation function is defined as the number of stars per unit volume of space in a mass range and a time interval. For all the main sequence stars have greater lifetimes than the galaxy, IMF and PDMF are equivalent. Similarly, IMF and PDMF are equivalent in brown dwarfs due to their unlimited lifetimes.

The properties and evolution of a star are closely related to its mass, so the IMF is an important diagnostic tool for astronomers studying large quantities of stars.  For example, the initial mass of a star is the primary factor of determining it's colour, luminosity, radius, radiation spectrum, and quantity of materials and energy it emitted into interstellar space during its lifetime.  At low masses, the IMF sets the Milky Way Galaxy mass budget and the number of substellar objects that form.  At intermediate masses, the IMF controls chemical enrichment of the interstellar medium.  At high masses, the IMF sets the number of core collapse supernovae that occur and therefore the kinetic energy feedback.

The IMF is relatively invariant from one group of stars to another, though some observations suggest that the IMF is different in different environments, and potentially dramatically different in early galaxies.

History 

The mass of a star can only be directly determined by applying Kepler's third law into binary stars system. However, the number of binary systems that can be observed is low, thus not enough samples to estimate the initial mass function. Therefore, stellar luminosity function is used to derive a mass function (present-day mass function, PDMF) by applying mass–luminosity relation. 

Commonly used forms of the IMF are the Kroupa (2001) broken power law and the Chabrier (2003) log-normal.

Salpeter (1955) 
Edwin E. Salpeter is the first astrophysicist who attempted to quantify IMF by applying power law into his equations. His work is based upon the sun-like stars that can be easily observed with great accuracy. Salpeter defined the mass function as the number of stars in a volume of space observed at a time as per logarithmic mass interval.

The Salpeter Initial Mass Function is 

Miller-Scalo (1979) 
Glenn E. Miller and John M. Scalo extended the work of Salpeter, by suggesting that the IMF "flattened" (approaching ) when stellar masses fell below one solar mass.

Kroupa (2001) 

 for 
 for 
 for

Chabrier (2003) 
Chabrier gave the following expression for the density of individual stars in the Galactic disk, in units of parsec:
 for 
This expression is log-normal, meaning that the logarithm of the mass follows a Gaussian distribution (up to one solar mass).

For stellar systems (e.g. binaries), he gave:
 for

Slope 
The initial mass function is typically graphed on a logarithm scale of log(N) vs log(m).  Such plots give approximately straight lines with a slope Γ equal to 1-α.  Hence Γ is often called the slope of the initial mass function.  The present-day mass function, for coeval formation, has the same slope except that it rolls off at higher masses which have evolved away from the main sequence.

Uncertainties 
There are large uncertainties concerning the substellar region. In particular, the classical assumption of a single IMF covering the whole substellar and stellar mass range is being questioned in favor of a two-component IMF to account for possible different formation modes of substellar objects. I.e. one IMF covering brown dwarfs and very-low-mass stars on the one hand, and another ranging from the higher-mass brown dwarfs to the most massive stars on the other. Note that this leads to an overlap region between about 0.05 and  where both formation modes may account for bodies in this mass range.

Variation 
The possible variation of the IMF affects our interpretation of the galaxy signals and the estimation of cosmic star formation history thus is important to consider.

In theory, the IMF should vary with different star-forming conditions. Higher ambient temperature increases the mass of collapsing gas clouds (Jeans mass); lower gas metallicity reduces the radiation pressure thus make the accretion of the gas easier, both lead to more massive stars being formed in a star cluster. The galaxy-wide IMF can be different from the star-cluster scale IMF and may systematically change with the galaxy star formation history.

Measurements of the local Universe where single stars can be resolved are consistent with an invariant IMF but the conclusion suffers from large measurement uncertainty due to the small number of massive stars and difficulties in distinguishing binary systems from the single stars. Thus IMF variation effect is not prominent enough to be observed in the local Universe. However, recent photometric survey across cosmic time does suggest a potentially systematic variation of the IMF at high redshift.

Systems formed at much earlier times or further from the Galactic neighborhood, where star formation activity can be hundreds or even thousands time stronger than the current Milky Way, may give a better understanding. It has been consistently reported both for star clusters and galaxies that there seems to be a systematic variation of the IMF. However, the measurements are less direct. For star clusters the IMF may change over time due to complicated dynamical evolution.

References

Notes 
1.Different mass of stars have different ages, thus modifying the star formation history would modify the present-day mass function, which mimics the effect of modifying the IMF.

Further reading 
 </ref>
 </ref>
 </ref>

External links
 

Stellar astronomy
Equations of astronomy
Mass